Roald Dahl's Tales of the Unexpected is a collection of 16 short stories written by British author Roald Dahl and first published in 1979. All of the stories were earlier published in various magazines, and then in the collections Someone Like You and Kiss Kiss.

Contents

 "Taste"
 "Lamb to the Slaughter"
 "Man from the South"
 "My Lady Love, My Dove"
 "Dip in the Pool"
 "Galloping Foxley"
 "Skin"
 "Neck"
 "Nunc Dimittis"
 "The Landlady"
 "William and Mary"
 "The Way Up to Heaven"
 "Parson's Pleasure"
 "Mrs Bixby and the Colonel's Coat"
 "Royal Jelly"
 "Edward the Conqueror"

Adaptations
Stories from this anthology were adapted for Anglia's popular television series Tales of the Unexpected, broadcast on ITV from 1979 to 1988.

References

Short story collections by Roald Dahl
1979 short story collections
Michael Joseph books